Dailey is a census-designated place (CDP) in Randolph County, West Virginia, United States. Dailey has a post office with ZIP code 26259. As of the 2010 census, its population was 114.

Located near Dailey is the Tygart Valley Homesteads Historic District, listed on the National Register of Historic Places in 2004.

Climate
This climatic region is typified by large seasonal temperature differences, with warm to hot (and often humid) summers and cold (sometimes severely cold) winters.  According to the Köppen Climate Classification system, Dailey has a humid continental climate, abbreviated "Dfb" on climate maps.

References

External links
 The Tygart Valley Homestead at the Traveling 219 project website at the Internet Archive

Census-designated places in Randolph County, West Virginia
Census-designated places in West Virginia